Alberto Curi Naime (born 23 August 1956) is a Mexican politician affiliated with the PRI. He served as Deputy of the LVII and LXII Legislature of the Mexican Congress representing the Mexico State.

References

1956 births
Living people
People from Toluca
Mexican people of Lebanese descent
Members of the Chamber of Deputies (Mexico)
Institutional Revolutionary Party politicians
21st-century Mexican politicians
Deputies of the LXII Legislature of Mexico
Politicians from the State of Mexico
20th-century Mexican politicians
Autonomous University of Mexico State alumni